James Hodges Harrison (born April 11, 1951) is an American lawyer and politician. He served in the South Carolina House of Representatives from 1990 to 2012 and, at his retirement, was chairman of the House's judiciary committee.

In 2018, he was found guilty of multiple charges related to public corruption.

References

Living people
1951 births
Republican Party members of the South Carolina House of Representatives
20th-century American politicians
21st-century American politicians
South Carolina politicians convicted of crimes